Chlamydastis gemina is a moth in the family Depressariidae. It was described by Philipp Christoph Zeller in 1855. It is found in Colombia.

References

Moths described in 1855
Chlamydastis
Taxa named by Philipp Christoph Zeller